The Dart River (officially Dart River / Te Awa Whakatipu from ) flows through rugged forested country in the southwestern South Island of New Zealand.

There are many popular tramping tracks in the region. The Rees-Dart Track is a five-day loop which combines the valley of Te Awa Whakatipu with the nearby Rees River. Jetboats operate on the river.

The Dart River, as many other areas in and around the Glenorchy and Queenstown area, was the location for many scenes filmed for The Lord of the Rings film trilogy. Examples  are Isengard, filmed at Dan's Paddock, and Lothlórien in the forests slightly further north.

The upper valley was the site of one of New Zealand's worst light aircraft accidents in 1989, when an Aspiring Air Britten-Norman Islander crashed, killing all ten people on board.

Name
The name Whakatipu is shared with several nearby geographic features, including Lake Wakatipu and Whakatipu Kā Tuka (the Hollyford River) though this name is an archaic term and its original meaning is no longer known. During the 1860s, the runholder William Gilbert Rees named the river the Dart, after the river's swift flow. 

In 1998, the river became one of nearly 90 geographic features to be given an official dual name as part of the Ngāi Tahu Claims Settlement Act 1998, a Treaty of Waitangi settlement between Ngāi Tahu and the Crown. This dual name combined the name Dart River with the Māori name, in recognition of the significance of both names.

Notes

References

Rivers of Otago
Mount Aspiring National Park
Rivers of New Zealand